Garganus is a genus of plant bugs in the family Miridae. There are about 12 described species in Garganus.

Species
These 12 species belong to the genus Garganus:

 Garganus albidivittis Stål, 1862
 Garganus andinus Carvalho, 1992
 Garganus argentinus Carvalho & Carpintero, 1989
 Garganus diversicornis Knight & Carvalho, 1943
 Garganus fusiformis (Say, 1832)
 Garganus gracilentus (Stål, 1860)
 Garganus insularis Carvalho & Becker, 1957
 Garganus magnus Carvalho & Gomes, 1969
 Garganus saltensis (Berg, 1892)
 Garganus splendidus Distant, 1893
 Garganus venezuelanus Carvalho, 1992
 Garganus vilcanisensis Carvalho, 1992

References

Further reading

External links

 

Miridae genera
Articles created by Qbugbot
Mirini